Sakariassen is a Norwegian surname. Notable people with the surname include:

Eirik Faret Sakariassen (born 1991), Norwegian politician
Håvard Sakariassen (born 1976), Norwegian footballer

Norwegian-language surnames